"Guillotine (It Goes Yah)" is a song by American experimental hip-hop group Death Grips, released as the lead single from their debut mixtape, Exmilitary. It was released on August 3, 2011.

Release
The music video for "Guillotine" was self-released by Death Grips on YouTube on April 26, 2011, as the lead single of their debut mixtape Exmilitary. It was eventually released as a single on iTunes on August 3, 2011.

Music video
The music video for "Guillotine" was shot by Matt Brown and features Death Grips' frontman MC Ride angrily rapping while riding in a car, with the visuals becoming increasingly corrupted by white noise. Zach Hill, the drummer for Death Grips, said in 2012 that it "made total sense to start filming in a car" as "Guillotine" is an "anxiety-fuelled" and "claustrophobic" song.

Reception
"Guillotine" was met with positive reviews by critics. John Calvert of The Quietus named the single as the stand-out song from Exmilitary. In July 2014, Complex ranked it as the third best Death Grips song, noting MC Ride's loud and aggressive vocal delivery as "confrontational". Hayley Elizabeth Kaufman of Flaunt called "Guillotine" a "sinister slice-and-dice track".

In popular culture
In 2013, choirmaster Gareth Malone performed a choir cover of "Guillotine" for his album Voices. In April 2019, Icelandic singer Björk played the song during a performance at a school dance in Iceland.

On November 11, 2021, a group of vigilante hackers defaced the Constitutional Court of Thailand's website homepage with the music video, also changing the website name to "kangaroo court". This action was done as a protest against pro-democracy activists ruled by the Constitutional Court, who were seeking to overthrow the government and monarchy.

See also
2011 in hip hop music

References

External links
 

2011 singles